My Bicycle (Chakma: Mor Thengari) is a Bangladeshi indie film directed by Aung Rakhine. It is the country's first Chakma language film.

The Bangladesh Film Censor Board blocked the commercial release of the film, which speculators have suggested may be due to the board not speaking Chakma or due to the film showing the army in a negative light. There were no professional actors involved in the production.

Plot
An indigenous man named Komol who is fired from a job in a town and returns to his hillside native village with only a bicycle. Although his son is happy to have his father back, but he has nothing to give his family except the bicycle. Komol decides to not return to the town for new jobs but tries to secure their livelihood through the cycle. He offers to ferry passengers and goods of villagers from place to place on his cycle and earn. Unfortunately one day an accident occurs, injuring an old man. Village goons threaten Komol and declare that no one can ride on that cycle. When Komol refuses to give them extortion, they destroy his bicycle.

Cast
 Kamal Mani Chakma as Komal
 Indira Chakma as Devi

Festivals and awards
 Best Screenplay, Ufa Silver Akbuzat Ethnic Cinema Festival  2016, Russia
 Honorable Mention, Cine Kurumin - Int. Indigenous Film Festival 2016, Brazil
 Tallinn Black Nights Film Festival  2015, Estonia
 Göteborg Film Festival 2016, Sweden
 Zanzibar International Film Festival 2016, Tanzania
 17th Asiatica Mediale Film Festival, Rome 2016
 15th Winnipeg Aboriginal Film festival 2016
 Skabmagovat Film Festival, Finland 2016
 Zanzibar International Film Festival, 2016
 Kasa Asia Film Festival, Span 2016
 Phnom Pehn International Film Festival, Combodia 2016
 Bare Bones International Film and Music Festival, USA 2017

Controversy
The film received some international recognition after its exhibition in several international film festivals, that include Tallinn Black Nights Film Festival, Göteborg Film Festival and Zanzibar International Film Festival. However, it has been banned by Bangladesh Film Censor Board from screening in Bangladesh. The Bangladesh Army took notice and lodged a complaint that the film showed the activities of the army in the Chittagong Hill Tracts which is a sensitive issue. The film was censored due to its unfavorable portrayal of the police and armed forces in Chittagong Hill Tracts conflict. Director Aung Rakhaine, alleged to the Censor Board for the violation of human rights.

References

External links
 

Bangladeshi drama films
2015 independent films
2015 drama films
2015 films
Censored films
Chakma language films
Bangladeshi independent films